The 1st Motorised Brigade was a formation of the Royal Hungarian Army that participated in the Axis invasion of Yugoslavia during World War II.

Organization 
Structure of the brigade:

 Headquarters
 1st Armoured Reconnaissance Battalion
 1st Battalion, 1st Motorized Infantry Regiment
 2nd Battalion, 1st Motorized Infantry Regiment
 3rd Battalion, 1st Motorized Infantry Regiment
 9th Bicycle Infantry Battalion
 10th Bicycle Infantry Regiment
 1st Motorized Artillery Battalion
 1st Motorized Anti-Aircraft Battery
 1st Motorized Engineer Company
 1st Motorized Bridging Engineer Company
 1st Motorized Signal Company
 1st Motorized Traffic Control Signal Company
 1st Motorized Brigade Service Regiment

Commanders 
 Brigade General Ödön Zay (1 Oct 1938 — 1 Mar 1940)
 Brigade General Jenö Major (1 Mar 1940 — 1 Nov 1941)
 Brigade General Gyözö Ankai-Anesini (1 Nov 1941 — 1 May 1942)
 Colonel Elemér Sáska (1 May 1942 — ? June 1942)

Notes

References
 

Military units and formations of Hungary in World War II